East Leake railway station is a former railway station serving East Leake, Nottinghamshire and is the only surviving Great Central Railway station accessed from an underbridge rather than an overbridge. The station opened  on 15 March 1899 and closed on 5 May 1969.  The Nottingham Heritage Railway passes through but the station has not reopened mainly due to lack of car parking, and with the station entrance being directly onto the road under the bridge, safety concerns were also a factor. A small goods siding next to the station was redeveloped for housing in the 1990s. The station buildings have been demolished, with the rubble used to fill in the area from the road entrance to the platform. The island platform remains in situ and could still be used if required. Rushcliffe Halt is nearby.

References 

 

Former Great Central Railway stations
Railway stations in Great Britain opened in 1899
Railway stations in Great Britain closed in 1969
Beeching closures in England
Disused railway stations in Nottinghamshire
East Leake
Great Central Railway (preserved)